Neolycaena rhymnus is a butterfly of the family Lycaenidae. It is found from Ukraine and southern and central Russia to the southern Ural mountains, Zauralye, the western and southern Altai Region, the Sayan mountains and Kazakhstan.
Seitz gives this description - T. rhymnus Ev. (73 f). Tailless, the wings brown above and beneath. The underside irrorated with numerous white short dashes, which are partly placed in rows and partly irregularly dispersed. — In South Russia, South Siberia to the Altai, in May and June, on steppes.

Adults are on wing from late May to mid June. There is one generation per year.

The larvae feed on Caragana frutex.

Subspecies
Neolycaena rhymnus rhymnus   
Neolycaena rhymnus betpakdalensis (western Kazakhstan)
Neolycaena rhymnus rufina (Katutau Mountains, Dzhungarsky Alatau, south-eastern Kazakhstan)

References

Lukhtanov, V.A., 1999: Eine neue ungewöhnliche art der gattung Neolycaena aus Kirgisien (Lepidoptera: Lycaenidae). Atalanta 30 (1/4): 129–134.
Tshikolovets, V. V., 2011. Butterflies of Europe & the Mediterranean Area Tshikolovets Publications, Pardubice, Czech Republic. . 
Zhdanko, A.B. in Tuzov, V. K. (ed.), 2000. Guide to the Butterflies of Russia and adjacent territories; Volume 2; Libytheidae, Danaidae, Nymphalidae, Riodinidae, Lycaenidae. Pensoft, Sofia.

External links
Butterflies of Kharkov Region
Fauna Europaea

Theclinae